The Xinjiang Production and Construction Corps, also known as XPCC or Bingtuan ("The Corps"), is a state-owned economic and paramilitary organization in China's Xinjiang Uyghur Autonomous Region (XUAR). 

In its history, the XPCC has built farms, towns, and cities, provided land and employment to disbanded military units, and re-settled Han migrants from other parts of China in what has been called a campaign of assimilation. It operates prisons and publicly traded companies.

Function 
The XPCC has administrative authority over medium-sized cities, settlements and farms in Xinjiang. It provides services such as healthcare, policing, judiciary, and education. Nominally subject to the XUAR, its internal affairs, including city and reclaimed land administration, are separate from that of the Autonomous Region and under direct control of the central government. The XPCC has been described to operate as a "state within a state."

History 

The XPCC draws from the traditional Chinese tuntian system, a policy of settling military units in frontier areas so that they become self-sufficient in food, and similar policies in the Tang and Qing dynasties. Construction corps were set up for sparsely populated frontier regions, including Heilongjiang, Inner Mongolia, and Xinjiang. 

After the Chinese Communist Party took control of Xinjiang in 1949, People's Liberation Army (PLA) forces deployed into Xinjiang were commanded to start production in the area. In 1953, PLA there were separated into National Defense and Production Divisions. XPCC was formed from soldiers from First Field Army, Kuomintang, and from the local Ili National Army. 

In October 1954 the Production Division was ordered by the Mao Zedong to form People's Liberation Army Xinjiang Production and Construction Corps, tasked to "Integrate labor with violent, colonize and populate the frontier" in 1954. 

XPCC was founded  by Wang Zhen. It initially comprised 175,000 military personnel, led by Tao Zhiyue as its first commander.

XPCC was initially focused on settling, cultivating, and developing sparsely populated areas, such as the fringes of the Taklimakan Desert and Gurbantunggut Desert, under the principle of "not competing for benefits with the local people". It provided a reserve military force, although they were not called upon. XPCC was expanded by youth from other parts of China, to equalize its sex ratio and include members with better education. In 1962, after the Sino-Soviet split, rioting occurred in Yining and 60,000 ethnic minorities living near the border fled to the Soviet Union. The Chinese government feared that the USSR was trying to destabilize China and start a war. XPCC was ordered to cultivate the farms of the exiles. By 1966 XPCC had a population of 1.48 million.

The XPCC was severely damaged by the Cultural Revolution. In 1975 it was abolished completely. Its powers were transferred to the government of Xinjiang and regional authorities. After the USSR invaded Afghanistan in 1979, and the Islamic mujahid movement gained force, fears of Soviet encirclement and Islamic fundamentalism led to the re-establishment of the XPCC in 1981 as well as the cultivation of frontier lands and economic development. During the 1990s, XPCC began to contribute significantly to Xinjiang's economy, producing 40% of the region's cotton in 1997. After 2008, as a result of improvements in farm mechanization, students were no longer compelled to pick the cotton crop.

Starting in the 1980s, a stated task has been to prevent and break down "destructive activities of the three forces", (separatism, religious extremism, and terrorism), in order to protect social stability and national unity. In 2012, XPCC generated 11.1 billion yuan from the 37 settlements they control, "allowing the Corps to spread advanced culture and Chinese culture, while taking in and infusing culture of ethnic minority in Xinjiang".

At the end of the 20th century, XPCC's military role was given instead to the Xinjiang Military District, a part of the current Western Theater Command that includes all of western China. XPCC military personnel are mostly reservists or militia.

Sanctions

United States 

XPCC was sanctioned by the United States in 2020, citing alleged human rights abuses. United States Commission on International Religious Freedom Commissioner Nury Turkel remarked "Now, no business can claim ignorance of China's oppression of the Uyghur people. We hope the sanctions signal to other Chinese officials that there are costs associated with taking part in the Communist Party's repression of religion. The world is watching and we know which officials and entities are responsible for the abuses against the Uyghur people." She added:

In July 2020, the United States announced Global Magnitsky Act sanctions on XPCC in connection with human rights abuses against Uyghurs and other ethnic minorities. XPCC was alleged to run many internment camps, as well as implementing the CCP's efforts to settle ethnic Han Chinese in the region.

In December 2020, the U.S. Customs and Border Protection announced that XPCC-produced cotton and cotton products would be prohibited from import into the U.S. due to forced labor concerns. In June 2021, the United States Department of Commerce placed XPCC on the Bureau of Industry and Security's Entity List.

European Union 
In March 2021, the Council of the European Union listed the XPCC Public Security Bureau as an entity subject to restrictive measures. The reason given for this listing was that this entity is "responsible for serious human rights violations, in particular large-scale arbitrary detentions and degrading treatment inflicted upon Uyghurs and people from other Muslim ethnic minorities".

Organization 
The XPCC is administered by the central government of  China and nominally the XUAR government. Its internal affairs, including the administration of its cities and reclaimed land, is separate from that of the Autonomous Region and under direct control of the central government. It has sub-provincial powers on par with sub-provincial cities. The Xinjiang Party Secretary serves as XPCC's "executive political commissar" , while the XPCC's own party chief typically concurrently serves as its political commissar and acts as its highest day-to-day authority. The party chief has power in Xinjiang second only to the XUAR party chief. The area and population of the XPCC are generally given as part of Xinjiang's total figures, but XPCC's GDP is generally reported separately.

XPCC is subdivided into divisions, then regiments. It is headquartered at Urumqi. Each XPCC division corresponds to a prefecture-level administrative division, and are in themselves of sub-prefectural rank. In addition to regiments, the XPCC also administers regiment-level farms and ranches.

XPCC and each individual division are headed by three leaders: a first political commissar, a political commissar, and a commander. The XUAR Chinese Communist Party Committee Secretary is the first political commissar of XPCC ex officio and the first political commissars of each XPCC division are likewise their committee secretaries.

Scholars consider the XPCC to act as a de facto prefecture-level governmental entity.

Administrative structure 
The XPCC's 14 divisions which are then subdivided into 185 regiment-level entities (including regiments, farms, and ranches), scattered throughout Xinjiang, mostly in previously unpopulated or sparsely populated areas.

The divisions are:

In May 1953, the PLA's 25th, 26th and 27th Divisions from the 9th Corps were reorganized as 7th, 8th and 9th Agriculture Construction Division of the XPCC, respectively.

Settlements 
The XPCC has settled Han Chinese in Xinjiang and has built eleven medium-sized cities during its history, and now controls ten of them. The governments of these cities are combined entirely with the division that controls them. For example, the division headquarters is the same entity as the city government, the division political commissar the same person as the city committee secretary, the division commander the same person as the city's mayor, and so forth. Ten XPCC-administered cities are nominally listed as "sub-prefectural-level cities" of Xinjiang Uyghur Administrative Region, but the government of Xinjiang is usually not involved in the administration of these cities.

Demographics 

37 ethnic groups are represented in the XPCC, the largest of which is the Han. Muslims, numbered at 250,000, are the largest religious group represented, along with smaller populations of Buddhists, Protestants, and Catholics. While the Han have been the largest group of XPCC workers, their relative numbers have declined: from 1980 to 1993 the overall population remained constant, while Han membership declined from 90% to 88%. As of 2014, about 12% of the population of Xinjiang was XPCC-connected.

The Eighth Division is the most populous division, with a population of 579,300 (2002).

Economic activity 
XPCC created many publicly traded subsidiary companies. XPCC uses the name "China Xinjian Group" for its economic activities. XPCC produced 17% of Xinjiang's GDP in 2013.

Its primary economic activity remains agriculture, including cotton, fruit, vegetables, food crops, vegetable oils, and sugar beets. Important products are cotton, tomatoes, ketchup, Korla pears, Turpan grapes, and wine. In 2018 the XPCC produced 30% of China's cotton output. XPCC has a mix of factory farming and smaller farms. XPCC dominates Xinjiang's agriculture and controls large amounts of land. During its history, XPCC established significant mining and mining-related industries, most of which subsequently were handed over to the Xinjiang government. XPCC is also involved in tertiary industries, including trade, distribution, real estate, tourism, construction and insurance.

Subsidiaries 
The XPCC has thousands of subsidiary companies. The Center for Advanced Defense Studies has identified 2,923 subsidiaries. Currently the XPCC has eleven publicly traded subsidiaries. They are:
Xinjiang Baihuacun Co., Ltd. (新疆百花村股份有限公司) (百花村, 600721.SS) – primarily information technology
Xinjiang Tianye Co., Ltd. (新疆天业股份有限公司) (新疆天业, 600075.SS) – primarily plastics
Suntime International Economic-Trading Co., Ltd. (新天国际经贸股份有限公司) (新天国际, 600084.SS) – primarily international trade
Xinjiang Talimu Agriculture Development Co., Ltd. (新疆塔里木农业综合开发股份有限公司) (新农开发, 600359.SS) – primarily cotton
Xinjiang Yilite Industry Co., Ltd. (新疆伊力特实业股份有限公司) (伊力特, 600197.SS) – primarily alcohol
Xinjiang Chalkis Co., Ltd (新疆中基实业股份有限公司) (新中基, 000972.SZ) – primarily tomatoes and related industries
Xinjiang Tianhong Papermaking Co., Ltd. (新疆天宏纸业股份有限公司) (新疆天宏, 600419.SS) – paper manufacturing
Xinjiang Tianfu Energy Co., Ltd. (新疆天富能源股份有限公司) (天富能源, 600509.SS) – electricity
Xinjiang Guannong Fruit & Antler Co., Ltd. (新疆冠农果茸股份有限公司) (冠农股份, 600251.SS) – fruits; animal husbandry
Xinjiang Qingsong Cement Co., Ltd. (新疆青松建材化工股份有限公司) (青松建化, 600425.SS) – cement
Xinjiang Sayram Modern Agriculture Co., Ltd. (新疆赛里木现代农业股份有限公司) (新赛股份, 600540.SS) – primarily cotton

Education and media 
XPCC operates its own educational system covering primary, secondary and tertiary education (including two universities, Shihezi University (石河子大学) and Tarim University (塔里木大学)); its own daily newspaper, Bingtuan Daily; and its own TV stations at both provincial and division levels.

References

Sources 

 Originally translated from the Chinese Wikipedia article
 Becquelin, Nicolas. "Xinjiang in the Nineties." The China Journal, no. 44 (2000): 65–90.
 Desai, Sohum, Study of the Infrastructure of Xinjiang, Security Research Review.
 McMillen, Donald H. "Xinjiang and the Production and Construction Corps: A Han Organisation in a Non-Han Region." The Australian Journal of Chinese Affairs, no. 6 (1981): 65–96.
 O'Neill, Mark, "The Conqueror of China's Wild West"  , Asia Sentinel, 13 April 2008.
 For additional information, see James D. Seymour, "Xinjiang's Production and Construction Corps, and the Sinification of Eastern Turkestan", Inner Asia, 2, 2000, pp. 171–193.

External links 
 Official site 

 
Construction and civil engineering companies of China
Companies based in Xinjiang
Government-owned companies of China
Paramilitary organizations based in China
Government paramilitary forces
Ürümqi
Construction and civil engineering companies established in 1954
1954 establishments in China
Non-combatant military personnel
Organizations associated with the Chinese Communist Party
Chinese companies established in 1954